Sonia Hahn (born August 25, 1967) is an American former professional tennis player. She is of Korean descent.

Biography
Hahn is originally from Carrollton, Georgia and played college tennis at the University of Kentucky. During her collegiate career she was a four-time All-American in singles and twice a doubles All-American. She won the university's Female Athlete of the Year award in 1987, then was SEC Player of the Year in 1988.

While in college Hahn represented the United States internationally, winning a gold medal at the 1987 Pan American Games, with Ronni Reis in the doubles event. She and Reis went on to feature together in the women's doubles at the 1987 US Open, which was her only grand slam main draw appearance. In 1987 she also won a doubles bronze, with Katrina Adams, at the 1987 Summer Universiade in Zagreb.

Since retiring she has been a long serving coach in college tennis. This includes 19-years as the co-head coach of the Tennessee Volunteers women's tennis team, along with then husband Mike Patrick.

ITF finals

Doubles: 6 (3–3)

References

External links
 
 

1967 births
Living people
American female tennis players
American tennis coaches
Tennis people from Georgia (U.S. state)
People from Carrollton, Georgia
Tennessee Volunteers and Lady Volunteers coaches
Kentucky Wildcats women's tennis players
Sportspeople from the Atlanta metropolitan area
American sportspeople of Korean descent
Pan American Games gold medalists for the United States
Pan American Games medalists in tennis
Tennis players at the 1987 Pan American Games
Universiade bronze medalists for the United States
Universiade medalists in tennis
Medalists at the 1987 Summer Universiade
Medalists at the 1987 Pan American Games
College tennis coaches in the United States